Jessica (originally Iessica, also Jesica, Jesika, Jessicah, Jessika, or Jessikah) is a female given name.

The oldest written record of the name with its current spelling is found as the name of the Shakespearean character Jessica, from the play The Merchant of Venice. The name may have been an Anglicisation of the biblical Iscah (from the Hebrew: יִסְכָּה: yīskāh), the name of a daughter of Haran briefly mentioned in the Book of Genesis . Iscah was rendered "Iesca" (Jeska) in the Matthew Bible version available in Shakespeare's day.

"Jessica" was the first- or second-most popular female baby name in the United States from 1981 to 1998 before falling out of the Top 20 in 2004. It also rose to #1 in England and Wales in 2005, dropping to #3 in 2006. Common nicknames of the name Jessica include "Jess", "Jessi" and "Jessie".

People with the given name

 Jessica Abel (born 1969), American comic book writer and artist
 Jessica Adolfsson (born 1998), Swedish ice hockey player
 Jessica Aguilar (born 1982), Mexican-American mixed martial artist
 Jessica Alba (born 1981), American actress
 Jessica Alexander (born 1999), English actress and model
 Jessica Alves (born 1983), Brazilian-British television personality
 Jessica Amornkuldilok (born 1985), Thai model, the winner of Asia's Next Top Model
 Jessica Anderson (footballer) (born 1997), Australian rules footballer
 Jessica Anderson (writer) (1916–2010), Australian novelist and short story writer
 Jessica Andersson (born 1973), Swedish singer
 Jessica Andrews (born 1983), American country music singer
 Jessica Antiles (born 1996), American swimmer
 Jessica-Jane Applegate (born 1996), British Paralympic swimmer
 Jessica Backhaus (born 1970), German photographer
 Jessica Bäckman (born 1997), Swedish racing driver
 Jessica Baglow (born 1989), English actress
 Jessica Balogun (born 1988), German professional boxer
 Jessica Barden (born 1992), English actress
 Jessica Bendinger (born 1966), American screenwriter and novelist
 Jessica Beinecke, American educator, entertainer, videographer and online personality in China
 Jessica Bejarano, founder and conductor of the San Francisco Philharmonic
 Jessica Benham, American politician and disability rights activist
 Jessica Berscheid (born 1997), Luxembourgish footballer
 Jessica-Bianca Wessolly (born 1996), German sprinter
 Jessica Biel (born 1982), American actress and model
 Jessica Blaszka (born 1992), retired Dutch wrestler
 Jessica Boehrs (born 1980), German actress and singer
 Jessica Bonilla (born 1996), Mexican female road and track cyclist
 Jessica Brody, American author
 Jessica Brown Findlay (born 1989), English actress
 Jessy Bulbo (born 1974), Mexican singer, bassist and composer
 Jessica Burciaga (born 1983), American model
 Jessica Caban (born 1982), American model, dancer and actress
 Jessica Cambensy (born 1988), American-born Hong Kong model and actress
 Jessica Capshaw (born 1976), American actress
 Jessica Care Moore (born 1971), American poet
 Jessica Caro (born 1988), Colombian footballer
 Jessica Castles (born 2002), English-Swedish artistic gymnast
 Jessica Chastain (born 1977), American actress
 Jessica Chávez (born 1988), Mexican professional boxer
 Jessica Ching (born 1987), Hong Kong racewalking athlete
 Jessica Cirio (born 1985), Argentine model
 Jessica Cisneros (born 1993), American attorney
 Jessica Clark (actress) (born 1985), British model and actress
 Jessica Clarke (born 1993), New Zealand model
 Jessica Clarke (footballer) (born 1989), English footballer
 Jessica G. L. Clarke (born 1983), American lawyer 
 Jessica-Jane Clement (born 1985), British glamour model, actress and TV presenter
 Jessica Coch (born 1979), Mexican actress
 Jessi Combs (1980–2019), American racer and TV presenter
 Jessica Cornish, known as Jessie J (born 1988), British singer-songwriter 
 Jessica Cottis (born 1979), Australian-British conductor
 Jessica Cox (born 1983), American pilot
 Jessica Cristina (born 1975), merengue artist and pop singer
 Jessica Davenport (born 1985), American basketball player
 Jessica De Gouw (born 1988), Australian actress
 Jessica Deglau (born 1980), Canadian swimmer
 Jessica Dereschuk (born 1983), American television personality and beauty queen
 Jessica DiCicco (born 1980), American actress
 Jessica Dominguez, immigration lawyer based in California
 Jessica Drake (born 1974), American pornographic actress
 Jessica Dubroff (1988–1996), American pilot trainee
 Jessica Durlacher (born 1961), Dutch literary critic, columnist and novelist
 Jessica Eddie (born 1984), English rower
 Jessica Ennis (born 1986), British athlete 
 Jessica Enström (born 1977), Swedish handball player
 Jessica Sompong Espiner (born 1997), Thai actress
 Jessica Esquivel, Mexican and American physicist and science communicator
 Jessica Eye (born 1986), American mixed martial artist
 Jessica Falk (born 1973), Swedish singer-songwriter and musician
 Jessica Falkholt (1988–2018), Australian actress
 Jessica Fintzen, German mathematician
 Jesica Fitriana (born 1995), Indonesian Ministry of Tourism Ambassador, HIV/AIDS activist, furniture designer, TV commercial model and a beauty pageant titleholder
 Jessica Fodera (born 1975), American musician, singer and artist, known professionally as Jessicka
 Jessica Folcker (born 1975), Swedish singer
 Jessica Fox (canoeist) (born 1994), French-Australian slalom canoer
 Jessica Gadirova (born 2004), English artistic gymnast
 Jessica Gagen, English beauty pageant titleholder who was crowned Miss England 2022
 Jessica Gal (born 1971), Dutch former judoka
 Jessica García (born 1980), Puerto Rican judoka 
 Jessica Garlick (born 1981), Welsh singer
 Jessica Gaspar (born 1976), American former professional basketball player
 Jessica Glynne, better known as Jess Glynne (born 1989), English singer-songwriter
 Jessica Gomes (born 1985), Australian model
 Jessica Gonzalez (born 1992 or 1993), American labor organizer
 Jessica González-Rojas (born 1976), American activist, politician, and academic
 Jessica Graf (born 1990), American reality television personality, actress, and model
 Jessica Haines (born 1978), South African actress
 Jessica Hall (British actress) (born 1981), English actress
 Jessica Hammerl (born 1988), German ice hockey defender
 Jessica Harp (born 1982), American country singer-songwriter and guitarist
 Jessica Harrison-Hall (born 1965, British sinologist, curator and author
 Jessica Hawkins (born 1995), British racing driver and stunt driver
 Jessica Hayllar (1858–1940), British artist and painter
 Jessica Heeringa (1987–?), American murder victim
 Jessica Helleberg (born 1986), Swedish handball player
 Jessica Hemmings, British academic and writer
 Jessica Henwick (born 1992), English actress and writer
 Jessica Hilzinger (born 1997), German alpine ski racer
 Jessica Hogg (born 1995), Welsh artistic gymnast
 Jessica Ho (rugby union) (born 1992), Hong Kong rugby union player
 Jessica Ho, known as Jessi (born 1988), American rapper, singer, and entertainer 
 Jessica Ho, known as Sica (born 2000), Hong Kong singer, musician, stage actress and cosplayer
 Jessica Holmes (born 1973), Canadian comedian and actress
 Jessica Hsuan (born 1970), Hong Kong actress
 Jessica Hynes (born 1972), British actress, writer and comedian
 Jessica Iskandar (born 1988), Indonesian actress and model
 Jessica Iwanson (born 1948), Swedish choreographer and artistic director
 Jessica Jackley (born 1977), American businesswoman and entrepreneur
 Jessica Jaymes (1979–2019), American pornographic actress
 Jessica Jerome (born 1987), American ski jumper
 Jessica Jordan  (born 1984), Bolivian-British politician, model and beauty pageant titleholder
 Jessica Joseph (born 1982), American ice dancer
 Jessica Judd (born 1995), English middle- and long-distance runner
 Jessica Jung (born 1989), American-Korean pop singer
 Jessica Kellgren-Fozard (born 1989), English YouTuber
 Jessica Kingdon, Chinese American director and producer
 Jessica Knappett (born 1984), English comedy writer and actress
 Jessica Krug, American historian, author, and activist
 Jessica Kürten (born 1969), Irish equestrian
 Jessica Lange (born 1949), American actress
 Jessica Landström (born 1984), former Swedish footballer
 Jessica Lapenn, American career member of the Senior Foreign Service
 Jessica Largey, American chef
 Jessica Larsson, Swedish two-time world champion bridge player
 Jessica Lee (cyclist) (born 1990), Hong Kong cyclist
 Jessica Lee Rose (born 1987), American-New Zealand actress
 Jessica Liedberg (born 1969), Swedish actress
 Jessica Lindell-Vikarby (born 1984), retired Swedish World Cup alpine ski racer
 Jessica Linley (born 1989), English beauty pageant winner who was crowned Miss England in 2010
 Jessica Mei Li (born 1995), English actress
 Jessica Lindstrom (born 1996), American professional basketball player
 Jesseca Liu (born 1979), Malaysian actress
 Jessica Lowndes (born 1988), Canadian actress and singer-songwriter
 Jessica Lu (born 1985), American actress
 Jessica Lucas (born 1985), Canadian actress and singer
 Jessica Lynch (Miss New York) (born 1979), American former pageant contestant
 Jessica Lynn (born 1990), country music singer and songwriter
 Jessica Mager (born 1988), German sports shooter
 Jessica Makinson (born 1978), American actress
 Jessica Marais (born 1985), South African-born Australian actress
 Jessica Marasigan (born 1994), Filipino-American model, host, singer, occasional actress and beauty queen
 Jessica Martin (born 1962), British actress and comedian
 Jessica Mauboy (born 1989), Australian singer
 Jessica Mbangeni (born 1977), South African praise poet and singer
 Jessica McCabe, American actress, writer, and YouTube personality
 Jessica McClure (born 1986), known as "Baby Jessica" when rescued from a well as a toddler
 Jessica Medina, American singer-songwriter
 Jessica Meir (born 1977), American astronaut, biologist, and underwater diver
 Jessica Mendoza (born 1980), American softball player and sportscaster
 Jessica Michibata, Japanese fashion model
 Jessica Mitford (1917–1996), Anglo-American writer
 Jessica Moore (basketball) (born 1982), American basketball player
 Jessica Moore (journalist) (born 1982), American journalist
 Jessica Moore (tennis) (born 1990), Australian tennis player
 Jessica Motaung (born 1973), South African television personality, sports executive and former beauty pageant winner
 Jessica Nettelbladt (born 1972), Swedish director and documentary filmmaker
 Jessica Nigri (born 1989), American cosplay enthusiast, promotional model, voice actress and Internet personality
 Jessica Nkosi (born 1990), South African actress
 Jessica Garza Montes de Oca (born 1984), Mexican actress, singer-songwriter and writer
 Jessica Olérs (born 1978), former Miss Sweden
 Jessica Opare-Saforo (born 1981), Ghanaian media personality, TV and radio broadcaster and entrepreneur
 Jessica Origliasso (born 1984), Australian musician
 Jessica Oyelowo (born 1978), British actress and singer
 Jessica Paré (born 1982), Canadian actress
 Jessica Parra (born 1995), Colombian professional racing cyclist
 Jessica Pasaphan (born 1988), Thai actress
 Jessica Pegula (born 1994), American tennis player
 Jessica Pengelly (born 1991), South African-born Australian swimmer
 Jessica Nery Plata (born 1994), Mexican professional boxer
 Jessica Plummer (born 1992), English actress and singer
 Jessica Polfjärd (born 1971), Swedish politician
 Jessica Rabbit (1st appearance 1981), Who Censored Roger Rabbit?
 Jessica Raine (born 1982), English actress
 Jessica Ransom (born 1981), British actress and writer
 Jessica Rawson (born 1943), English art historian, curator and sinologist
 Jessica Regan (born 1982), Irish actress
 Jessica Kelly Siobhan Reilly, known as Kelly Reilly (born 1977), English actress
 Jessica Ridgeway (2002–2012), American murder victim
 Jessica Rivera (born 1974), American soprano
 Jessica Rodén (born 1976), Swedish politician
 Jessica Rodríguez (born 1981), pageant titleholder
 Jessica Roland-Pratt (born 1982), former professional tennis player from Puerto Rico
 Jessica Rosencrantz (born 1987), Swedish politician
 Jessica Rosenthal (born 1992), German politician
 Jessica Rossi (born 1992), Italian sport shooter
 Jessica Rothe (born 1987), American actress
 Jessica Roux (born 1992), South African distance swimmer
 Jessica Ryde (born 1994), Swedish handball player
 Jessica Salazar (born 1995), Mexican professional track cyclist
 Jessica Samuelsson (heptathlete) (born 1985), Swedish former heptathlete
 Jessica Sanchez (born 1995), American recording artist
 Jessica Savitch (1947–1983), American TV news reporter
 Jessica Scheel (born 1990), Guatemalan model and beauty pageant titleholder
 Jessica Schilder (born 1999), Dutch athlete
 Jessica Schmidt (born 1979), German chess Women Grandmaster
 Jessica Schwarz (born 1977), German film and TV actress
 Jessica Simpson (born 1980), American pop singer and actress
 Jessica Sklar, American mathematician
 Jessica Smith (editor) (1895–1983), American editor and activist
 Jessica Soho (born 1964), Filipina broadcast journalist
 Jessica Stam (born 1986), Canadian model
 Jessica Stasinowsky (born 1985), Australian convicted murderer
 Jessica Steck (born 1978), South African former tennis player
 Jessica Steen, Canadian actress
 Jessica Steffens (born 1987), American water polo player
 Jessica Stegrud (born 1970), Swedish politician
 Jessica Steiger (born 1992), German swimmer
 Jessica Steinhauser, known as Asia Carrera (born 1973), American pornographic actress
 Jessica Stroup (born 1986), American actress and model
 Jessica Sula (born 1994), Welsh actress
 Jessica Sutta (born 1982), American dancer and singer
 Jessica Sutton (born 1993), South African actress
 Jessica Swale (born 1982), British playwright, theatre director and screenwriter
 Jessica Szohr (born 1985), American actress
 Jessica Tan (born 1966), Singaporean politician
 Jessica Tan (badminton) (born 1993), Singaporean badminton player
 Jessica Tandy (1909–1994), English-American actress
 Jessica Tatti (born 1981), German politician
 Jessica Taylor (born 1980), English singer
 Jessica Taylor (author), British feminist author and campaigner
 Jessica Tejada (born 1971), retired Peruvian female volleyball player
 Jessica Thunander (born 1973), Swedish politician 
 Jessica Torny (born 1980), Dutch footballer
 Jessica Townsend (born 1985), Australian author
 Jessica Salazar Trejo (born 1991), Mexican politician
 Jessica Trisko-Darden (born 1984), Canadian academic, activist, former model, and beauty queen
 Jessica Tsoi, Hong Kong singer
 Jessica Upshaw (1959–2013), American politician and lawyer
 Jessica Utts (born 1952), American statistician
 Jessica van der Spil (born 1979), Dutch judoka
 Jessica Van Der Steen (born 1984), Belgian fashion model
 Jessica van Eijs (born 1981), Dutch politician
 Jessica Varnish (born 1990), British track cyclist
 Jessica Vetter (born 1985), American ice hockey player
 Jessica Villarubin (born 1996), Filipino singer and performer
 Jessica von Bredow-Werndl (born 1986), German Olympic dressage rider
 Jessica Voorsanger (born 1965), American artist
 Jessica Wahls (born 1977), German pop singer
 Jessica Walter (1941–2021), American actress
 Jessica Watkins (born 1988), American astronaut, geologist, aquanaut and former international rugby player
 Jessica Weller (born 1983), German politician
 Jessica Wetterling (born 1986), Swedish politician
 Jessica White (born 1984), American model
 Jessica Wich (born 1990), German footballer
 Jessica Wik (born 1992), Swedish professional footballer 
 Jessica Williams (actress), American actress and comedian
 Jessica Williams (musician) (1948–2022), American pianist and composer 
 Jessica Wong (born 1991), Canadian ice hockey player
 Jessica L. Wright (born 1952), American politician
 Jessica Keenan Wynn (born 1986), American actress
 Jessica Xue (born 1994), Chinese radio host, model and beauty pageant titleholder
 Jessica Yaniv, Canadian transgender activist
 Jessica Yellin (born 1971), American journalist
 Jessica Yu (born 1966), American film director
 Jessica Zafra (born 1965), Filipina writer
 Jessica Zahedi (born 1978), German television presenter and journalist
 Jessica Zajicek, American actress
 Jessica Zandén (born 1957), Swedish actress
 Jessica Zelinka (born 1981), Canadian pentathlete
 Jessica Zhu (born 1986), Chinese-American pianist

People with the middle name
 Sarah Jessica Parker (born 1965), American actress, model, singer and producer

Fictional characters

 Jessica (The Merchant of Venice), in William Shakespeare's The Merchant of Venice
 Lady Jessica, in the Dune science fiction universe
 Jessica in the Rick Griffin webcomic "Housepets!"
 Jessica (originally Reika), in the Japanese TV series Stitch!
 Jessica Baker, in the 2003 film Cheaper by the Dozen and its sequel
 Jessica "Jessie" Bannon, in the television series The Real Adventures of Jonny Quest
 Jessica "Jess" Bradley, protégé/scapegoat of James Stillwell in the comic series The Boys
 Jessica Cruz, superhero in DC Comics universe
 Jessica Darling, in a novel series by Megan McCafferty
 Jessica Davis, in the novel and Netflix series 13 Reasons Why
 Jessica Day, in the sitcom New Girl
 Jessica Drew, in the Marvel Comics Universe series Spider-Woman
 Jessica Fisher, in the television series Waterloo Road
 Jessica Fletcher, in the American television mystery series Murder, She Wrote
 Jessica Glitter, in the American sitcom How I Met Your Mother
 Jessica Hamby, in the HBO series True Blood
 Jessica James, in The Incredible Jessica James
 Jessica Jones, a superhero in the Marvel Comics Universe
 Jessica Lovejoy, in the television series The Simpsons
 Jessica Moore, in the TV series Supernatural
 Jessica Morgan, the main human protagonist of The Transformers Season 3, "The Return of Optimus Prime"
 Jessica Olson, from the Disney channel original movie, Starstruck (2010 film)
 Jessica Rabbit, in the Who Framed Roger Rabbit series
 Jessica "Jesse" Miriam Reeves, in the 2002 film Queen of the Damned 
 Jessica Riggs, in the 1989 film Prancer 
 Jessica Riley, a playable character in the survival horror game Until Dawn
 Jessica Ruiz, in the television series The Electric Company
 Jessica Sanders, in the NBC science fiction drama Heroes
 Jessica Stanley, in the Twilight Saga written by Stephenie Meyer
 Jessica Stiehl, fictional character in the German soap opera Verbotene Liebe (Forbidden Love)
 Jessica Tate, in the American TV series Soap
 Jessica Ushiromiya, from Umineko no Naku Koro ni
 Jessica Wakefield, in the Sweet Valley High and Sweet Valley Twins novels
 Jessica Walsh (born 1986), American designer, art director, illustrator and educator
 Jessica Warren, in the television series Bones

See also
 
 Jessie (disambiguation)
 Jess (disambiguation)
 Baby Jessica case
 Jessica's Law
 Jessica (instrumental)

References

English feminine given names
English given names invented by fiction writers
Feminine given names
Given names
Hebrew feminine given names
Modern names of Hebrew origin